Magnolia hypolampra is a species of plant in the family Magnoliaceae. It is native to China and Vietnam.

References

hypolampra
Trees of China
Flora of Vietnam
Taxonomy articles created by Polbot